This is a list of Michigan state parks and related protected areas under the jurisdiction or owned by the Michigan Department of Natural Resources (DNR) Parks and Recreation Division. A total of 106 state parks, state recreation areas and trail state parks currently exist along with eight other sites as well as 16 state harbors on the Great Lakes. While the Parks and Recreation Division directly manages the large majority of the parks in the system, a few are either jointly-managed with other agencies or are leased to other governmental entities, either temporarily or on an ongoing basis. The state parks and recreation areas statewide collectively saw more than 26 million visits in 2016.

History
Michigan's state parks system was started in 1919. Three Michigan state parks pre-date the creation of the park system in 1919: Mackinac Island State Park (1895), Michilimackinac State Park (1909) and Interlochen State Park (1917). 

Mackinac Island State Park was created in 1895. It had served as the nation's second national park for two decades beginning in 1875. In 1909, Michilimackinac State Park was created in nearby Mackinaw City. Both of these parks, along with Historic Mill Creek State Park are under the jurisdiction of the Mackinac Island State Park Commission.

Interlochen State Park was purchased by the Michigan Legislature in 1917 and was the first public park to be transferred to the Michigan State Park Commission in 1920. Because Mackinac Island State Park was a federal gift with its own commission and jurisdiction, for those reasons some choose to not consider it the first state park even though it predates Interlochen State Park by nearly 25 years.

Since 1919, 33 additional state park units have been decommissioned for varied reasons. The majority of these former state park units, 16, were transferred to counties or cities and are still local parks today. Four of the former units were incorporated into Michigan's two National Lakeshores when were created in the 1960s and 70s, while five others were removed and reverted into surrounding state lands (state game areas, state forests, state fish hatcheries, etc.). Four of the units were incorporated into larger state recreation areas in the 1940s in the Greater Detroit area, although one of those recreation areas is now a local park. Two of the former state park units are now state forest campgrounds and another two units existed on state lands which were sold to private interests and closed. (The Former state park units section lists each of these former units.)

Additional DNR facilities
It also operates 16 "harbors of refuge" as well as providing support for the other 61 harbors in the system. There are 13 state underwater preserves covering  of Great Lakes bottomland and ten of them have a maritime museum or interpretive center in a nearby coastal community.

The DNR Parks and Recreation Division also manages 138 state forest campgrounds (including a dozen equestrian campgrounds). DNR also oversees the trail systems in the state.
 
For a discussion of all protected areas in Michigan under all jurisdictions, see Protected areas of Michigan.

Michigan state parks

Michigan state recreation areas

Michigan trail state parks
The following state trails are units of the State Park System. Several other state trails fall under Department of Natural Resources jurisdiction and/or maintenance, but are not state park units and are not included here.

Other sites

Former state park units
Benzie State Park – (1929–1975) donated to the National Park Service in 1975 and is now the Platte River Campground of Sleeping Bear Dunes National Lakeshore
Bloomer State Park No. 1 – (1922–late 1960s) 36 acres, absorbed into Proud Lake State Recreation Area; now Bloomer Park in West Bloomfield Township
Bloomer State Park No. 2 – (1922–1945) 50 acres, originally Dodge Brothers State Park No. 7; incorporated into Rochester-Utica State Recreation Area, now Bloomer Park in Rochester Hills
Bloomer State Park No. 3 – (1922–1944) 100 acres, later incorporated into Ortonville State Recreation Area, northeast of Ortonville
Bloomer State Park No. 4 – (1922–1947), 28 acres, now Bloomer Park in White Lake Township, undeveloped site sold as it was "not of state park calibre" with funds used to purchased additional lands for the new Rochester-Utica State Recreation Area
Cheboygan State Park – (c.1921–1945) 15 acres, original state park located on the site of the current Cheboygan County Fairground, originally known as O'Brien's Grove (not to be confused with present-day Cheboygan State Park)
D.H. Day State Park – (1920–1975) later consolidated with nearby Sleeping Bear-Glen Lake State Park (1959); donated to the National Park Service in 1975 and is now the D.H. Day Campground of Sleeping Bear Dunes National Lakeshore
Detour State Park – (1958– ) 403 acres, now Detour State Forest Campground in Lake Superior State Forest, west of De Tour Village
Dodge Brothers State Park No. 1 – (1922–1944) 22 acres, name later changes to Island Lake Dodge Brothers No.1 State Park; incorporated into Island Lake State Recreation Area in 1944
Dodge Brothers State Park No. 2 – (1922–1947) 26 acres, now Lakeshore Park in Novi
Dodge Brothers State Park No. 3 – (1922– ) 13 acres, on Crescent Lake west of Pontiac, now Optimist Park, in Waterford.
Dodge Brothers State Park No. 5 – (1922– ) 80 acres, now Dodge Park V in Commerce Township
Dodge Brothers State Park No. 6 – (1922– ) 35 acres, now Beverly Park in Beverly Hills
Dodge Brothers State Park No. 7 – (1922–1947) originally designated Dodge Brothers State Park No. 11, renamed to No. 7 when the original No. 7 became Bloomer State Park No. 2; 240 acres, now Horseshoe Lake State Game Area near Oxford
Dodge Brothers State Park No. 8 – (1922–1973) 41.2 acres, now Dodge Park in Sterling Heights
Dodge Brothers State Park No. 9 – (1922–1960) 30 acres, now Dodge Park in South Rockwood
Dodge Brothers State Park No.10 – (1922–1944) 78 acres, incorporated into Highland State Recreation Area near Highland in 1944
East Tawas State Park - (1921–1965) now East Tawas City Park in East Tawas
Frank W. Fletcher State Park – (1920–c.1947) 160 acres, now Sunken Lake County Park northwest of Alpena
Gladwin State Park – (1921–1982) 302 acres, now Gladwin City Park in Gladwin
Grand Marais State Park - (1931–1966) incorporated into the easternmost portion of the Pictured Rocks National Lakeshore (Grand Sable Dunes Area)
Hansen Military Reserve – (c.1921– ) southwest of Grayling, managed as a state park for recreation purposes
Lake City State Park ( –c.1947) – at Lake City, now the Missaukee County Park
Magnus State Park ( –1949) – 16 acres, now Magnus City Park in Petoskey
Marquette State Park ( –1947) – now a subdivision of homes west of Marquette
Munuskong State Park – a Dodge Brothers state park on Munuscong Bay northeast of Pickford, now part of the Munuscong State Wildlife Management Area
Paw Paw State Park – (c.1921–c.1927) in Paw Paw on Maple Lake
Pere Marquette River State Park – (1927–c.1940s) four sites—33, 12, 77 and 189 acres, respectively, along the Pere Marquette River in Mason County
Pictured Rocks State Park (1953–1966) - incorporated into the westernmost portion of the Pictured Rocks National Lakeshore
Rochester-Utica State Recreation Area (originally Bloomer State Park No.2) – (1945–1992) a portion was also part of Spring Hill Farm, the country estate of boxer Joe Louis, (1939–1944); now Bloomer City Park (Rochester Hills) and River Bends Park (Shelby Township)
Saint Clair (County) State Park – (1926–1949) 17 acres, former St. Clair County Park (1919–1926) gifted to the state; abandoned as a state park in 1949 due to the proximity of nearby Port Huron (Lakeport) State Park and given its small size; deeded to township and is now Burtchville Township Park.
Sidnaw State Park – (1931– ) 1,500 acres, formed from the Sidnaw Fish Hatchery lands near Sidnaw
Sleeping Bear-Glen Lake State Park – (1946–1959) 2,044 acres (5,800 acres in proposed park boundary), centered on state lands received from the federal government in the Sleeping Bear Dunes area, later consolidated with D.H. Day State Park (1959); donated to the National Park Service in 1975 and is now part of the Sleeping Bear Dunes National Lakeshore
Van Etten Lake State Park – (1928– ) now Van Etten Lake State Forest Campground near Oscoda
White Cloud State Park – (c.1921–c.1980) now White Cloud County Park in White Cloud

Michigan state forests

Michigan's state forest system is administered by the Forest Resources Division (FRD) within the Michigan Department of Natural Resources, not the Parks and Recreation Division (PRD) which manages the state park system, however the Parks and Recreation Division took over the recreation responsibilities of the Forest Resources Division (e.g. the state forest campgrounds and the trails and pathways within the state forests) in January 2012.
Au Sable State Forest
Copper Country State Forest
Escanaba River State Forest
Lake Superior State Forest
Mackinaw State Forest
Pere Marquette State Forest

References

External links

Michigan Department of Natural Resources

 
Michigan state parks
State parks